Cathal O'Connell is an Irish hurler who plays as a forward for the Clare senior team. At club level he plays with Clonlara.

O'Connell won the All-Ireland Under-21 Hurling Championship in 2012, 2013 and 2014 with Clare, and was a member of the panel that won the 2013 All-Ireland Senior Hurling Championship.

Honours
 All-Ireland Senior Hurling Championship (1): 2013
 Munster Under-21 Hurling Championship (2) : 2012, 2013, 2014
 All-Ireland Under-21 Hurling Championship (2) : 2012, 2013, 2014
 Munster Minor Hurling Championship (2) : 2010, 2011

References

Clonlara hurlers
Clare inter-county hurlers
Year of birth missing (living people)
Living people